Floyd Nease may refer to:

Floyd W. Nease, president of the Eastern Nazarene College from 1924 to 1930
Floyd Nease (politician), his grandson, the former Democratic Majority Leader for the Vermont State House